The 2011 Ironman World Championship was held on October 8, 2011, in Kailua-Kona, Hawaii and won by Craig Alexander of Australia and Chrissie Wellington of England. It was the 35th such Ironman Triathlon World Championships, which has been held annually in Hawaii since 1978, with an additional race in 1982. The championship is organised by the World Triathlon Corporation (WTC).

Championship results

Men

Alexander's overall time broke the previous course record by 12 seconds, which was set by Luc Van Lierde in 1996.

Women

Both Carfrae and Wellington broke the championship course record for the marathon, set last year by Carfrae.

Qualification
To enter for the 2011 World Championship race, age-group athletes are required to qualify through a performance at an Ironman or selected Ironman 70.3 race. Entry into the race can also be obtained through a random allocation lottery or through the Ironman's charitable eBay auction.

For professional triathletes, the 2011 Championship season marks the first year of a point system that determines which professional triathletes will qualify for the championship race. To qualify, points are earned by competing in WTC sanctioned Ironman and selected Ironman 70.3 events throughout the qualifying year. For the 2011 race that period was September 12, 2010 to August 31, 2011. The top 50 male and top 30 female pros in points at the end of each qualifying year qualify to race in Kona. Prior champions receive an automatic entry for the Championship race for a period of five years after their last championship performance provided that they compete in at least one full-distance Ironman race during the qualifying year.

The Ironman 2011 Series consisted of 22 Ironman races plus the Ironman World Championship 2010 which was itself a qualifier for the 2011 Ironman World Championship. The series started with Ironman Wisconsin 2010 held on September 12, 2010.

Qualifying Ironmans

China cancellation
On May 12, 2011, the WTC announced that the 2011 Ironman China and Ironman 70.3 China races, scheduled for May 29 in Jixian, Tianjin Province, China, were canceled. The Tianjin Sports Bureau (TSB) was unable to obtain the required sanctions from the China Triathlon Sports Association (CTSA) to conduct the event. Murphy Reinschreiber, managing director of the Asia Pacific region for WTC stated that "TSB simply failed to provide all of the documentation necessary for CTSA to process the sanction." WTC is offering a full refund of entry fees to all athletes who were scheduled to compete at Ironman China and Ironman 70.3 China.  Additionally, all athletes were offered a complimentary race entry into any of the 2011 Ironman and Ironman 70.3 races. WTC is allocating the age group qualifying slots from Ironman China and Ironman 70.3 China to other races in the region to ensure that athletes from the Asia-Pacific region are represented at the 2011 World Championship events.

2011 Ironman Series results

Men

Women

References

External links
Ironman website
Professional Triathlete Qualifying Rules

Ironman World Championship
Ironman
Sports competitions in Hawaii
2011 in sports in Hawaii
Triathlon competitions in the United States